Charity: water (stylized as charity: water) is a non-profit organization founded in 2006 that provides drinking water to people in developing nations. , the organization has raised $370 million. According to the organization, it has funded 111,000 water projects in 29 countries though it does not know how many of the projects are still functional.

History
Founder Scott Harrison was a New York City club promoter for ten years. From 2004, Harrison committed two years of his life to the poor and marginalized through volunteer service in Liberia with Mercy Ships. He recognized that problems surrounding education, safety, and health may trace back to a lack of clean water and basic sanitation systems.

Harrison founded the charity in 2006. In 2007, Harrison contacted several tech entrepreneurs for assistance and advice. Among those he contacted through a 'cold email' were Facebook’s Mark Zuckerberg, MySpace’s Tom Anderson and Bebo’s Michael Birch. Birch was the first to respond with monetary, technical assistance, and introductions to influential leaders in Silicon Valley's technology industry. Birch redesigned the charity's website and personally donated $1 million.

Operations 
The organization has drilled some 38,000 wells for villagers in Ethiopia, Rwanda and other countries in sub-Saharan Africa and Asia. It has no idea how many of the wells are still functioning, despite initial claims that the wells would provide water for decades. It is sure that some are not working.

Reporting
charity:water provides public reports but these often exclude key indicators of performance. Reports do not provide information of water-well effectiveness nor metrics such as the average required travel time to water sources and the number of well projects currently functioning.

Financing
The organization set up two separate donation funds and claimed that 100% of donations received from the public go to program costs. A small group of wealthy mega donors called "The Well" (133 in 2019) makes donations to cover the organization's overhead ($11 million in 2019). In 2018, the organization raised $70 million. It paid $47 million for program expenses, $4.5 million for administrative expenses, and $7.7 million for fundraising expenses.  

The mega donors are celebrated at the organization's annual charity ball, and many of them accompany Harrison on trips to Africa. 

In 2017, Harrison received a salary of $325,278. The organization’s “chief water officer” received $293,442.

In 2019, a new program was created to allow entrepreneurs to donate equity to Charity: water. When their companies are sold or go public, some of the proceeds are paid to the charity's employees as bonuses.

Partnerships
In December 2012, charity: water received a $5 million grant from Google's Global Impact Awards. The grant was to fund the installation of 4,000 sensors to report on status and working conditions of wells installed in Ethiopia, Nepal, and a few other nations in Africa and Asia.

In 2015, charity: water partnered with the silicone bracelet company Lokai.

Fundraising

charity:ball
For over a decade, the organization has hosted an annual lavish gala that raises millions from high net worth individuals. In 2015, it held its first black-tie gala, at The Metropolitan Museum of Art's Temple of Dendur. At the 2017 gala, organizers visited Ethiopia to take photos of children that could be matched with gala attendees.

Ride for Water
Ride for Water is an annual fundraiser that started in 2013 and involves cycling across the United States to raise awareness for the charity. In 2019 the team completed a 52 day journey. The 3,437-mile trip started on May 20 and traversed 12 states from coast to coast and raised $25,000 on the day of completion. From 2013 through to 2015 the team only included males. In 2016, teams of men and women rode separately for much of the journey but then joined up for the final stretch to New York. The Ride for Water initiative is loosely affiliated with Azusa Pacific University because the first time it took place it was arranged by a group of graduates.

Reception
Charity evaluator GiveWell published a review of the organization in December 2012. Their overall conclusion was that it "stands out from other organizations we have considered in some respects (such as conducting evaluations that include frank discussions of problems), but we remain uncertain about the humanitarian impact of their work and the relative effectiveness of their partner selection process." In January 2013, an article by Anne Elizabeth Moore on Truthout stated that "questions about its impact and methods remain" and that "transparency may keep critics at bay, yet what remains unclear is exactly how many more people have reliable access to clean drinking water now than did six years ago."

As of July 2021, Charity Navigator rated the organization at 4 out of 4 stars. The charity had an overall rating of 91.95 out of 100 with an "Accountability & Transparency" score of the maximum 100 and "Financial" rating of 88.62 as of July 2021. Guidestar gave the organization a "Platinum Seal of Transparency".

References

External links
 

Non-profit organizations based in New York City
Organizations established in 2006
Water organizations in the United States
Water-related charities
2006 establishments in the United States
Charities based in New York City